Allende Municipality  is one of 67 municipalities in the Mexican state of Chihuahua, located in the southeastern portion of the state. Valle de Allende is its municipal seat and largest city. Its main claim to fame is the 1969 fall of the Allende meteorite.

Demographics
As of 2010, the municipality had a total population of 8,409, up from 8,263 as of 2005.

Localities
The municipality had 146 localities, the largest of which (with 2010 populations in parentheses) were: Valle de Ignacio Allende (4,185), classified as urban, and Pueblito de Allende (1,381), classified as rural.

Towns and villages

Government

Municipal presidents

References

See also 
Municipal Government Web Site (Spanish)

Municipalities of Chihuahua (state)